The Glossop Gazette is a fortnightly newspaper published by Viper Press in Glossop. The paper is specifically aimed at the local area, carrying no news from outside Glossop.

References

Newspapers published in Derbyshire
Glossop